Kamloops-North Thompson is a provincial electoral district for the Legislative Assembly of British Columbia, Canada. 

It was formerly considered a political bellwether for the next provincial government, having swung to the governing party ever since party politics was introduced into British Columbia. This trend broke in 2017, when the district was won by a BC Liberal despite a BC NDP government being sworn in.

Demographics

Geography
As of the 2020 provincial election, Kamloops-North Thompson comprises the northeastern portion of the Thompson-Nicola Regional District. It is located in central British Columbia. Communities in the electoral district consist of Kamloops, north of the Thompson river, Clearwater, and Barriere.

History

Election results 

|-

|align="center"|n/a
|align="right"|$84,848

|- style="background:white;"
! style="text-align:right;" colspan="3"|Total Valid Votes
!align="right"|20,943
!align="right"|100%
|- style="background:white;"
! style="text-align:right;" colspan="3"|Total Rejected Ballots
!align="right"|112
!align="right"|0.5%
|- style="background:white;"
! style="text-align:right;" colspan="3"|Turnout
!align="right"|21,055
!align="right"|55%
|}

|-

|-
 
|NDP
|Mike Hanson
|align="right"|9,635
|align="right"|40.00%
|align="right"|
|align="right"|$70,259

|- style="background:white;"
! style="text-align:right;" colspan="3"|Total Valid Votes
!align="right"|24,088
!align="right"|100%
|- style="background:white;"
! style="text-align:right;" colspan="3"|Total Rejected Ballots
!align="right"|150
!align="right"|0.62%
|- style="background:white;"
! style="text-align:right;" colspan="3"|Turnout
!align="right"|24,238
!align="right"|67.71%
|}

|-

|-
 
|NDP
|Dwayne Hartle
|align="right"|4,181
|align="right"|19.14%
|align="right"|
|align="right"|$24,205

|}

|-

|-
 
|NDP
|Frederick H. Jackson
|align="right"|6,945
|align="right"|41.25%
|align="right"|
|align="right"|$24,546

|}

|-
 
|NDP
|Frederick H. Jackson
|align="right"|5,843
|align="right"|39.43%
|align="right"|
|align="right"|$27,214
|-

|}

References

External links 
BC Stats - 2001 (pdf)
Results of 2001 election (pdf)
2001 Expenditures (pdf)
Results of 1996 election
1996 Expenditures (pdf)
Results of 1991 election
1991 Expenditures
Website of the Legislative Assembly of British Columbia

British Columbia provincial electoral districts
Kamloops